David Walter Jourdan (born December 5, 1954) is an author, founder of Meridian Sciences, and the co-founder and president of Nauticos, a deep ocean exploration company.  He studied physics and engineering at the U.S. Naval Academy and Johns Hopkins University, and served as a U.S. Navy submarine officer during the Cold War.  Jourdan and his Nauticos team have made a number of notable deep ocean discoveries, including the missing Israeli submarine INS Dakar in the Mediterranean and the Japanese aircraft carrier Kaga, sunk in the battle of Midway.  Most recently he has led two deep ocean expeditions in search of Amelia Earhart’s lost Lockheed Electra airplane.  He has published several books, Never Forgotten: the Search and Discovery of Israel's Lost Submarine Dakar; The Deep Sea Quest for Amelia Earhart.; and The Search for the Japanese Fleet: USS Nautilus and the Battle of Midway.

He has claimed any transmissions attributed to Gardner Island (now called Nikumaroro) in the Phoenix Island Group were false. Through his company Nauticos he extensively searched a  quadrant north and west of Howland Island during two deep-sea sonar expeditions (2002 and 2006, total cost $4.5 million) and found nothing. The search locations were derived from the line of position (157–337) broadcast by Earhart on July 2, 1937. Nevertheless, Elgen Long's interpretations have led Jourdan to conclude, "The analysis of all the data we have – the fuel analysis, the radio calls, other things – tells me she went into the water off Howland."

References

External links 
http://www.earhartdiscovery.com/
http://www.nauticos.com/
http://dakarneverforgotten.com/

Living people
1954 births